Hensleigh Carthew Marryat "Car" Norris  (12 March 1893 – 3 September 1980) was a New Zealand lawyer, soldier, Anglican layman and historian.

Norris had a variety of interests and was awarded life membership by various organisations. Two of his books, Armed settlers (1956) and Settlers in depression (1964), are regarded as standard histories for Hamilton covering the period 1864 to 1894.

In the 1975 Queen's Birthday Honours, Norris was appointed a Companion of the Queen's Service Order for community service.

References

1893 births
1980 deaths
New Zealand military personnel
20th-century New Zealand lawyers
20th-century New Zealand historians
People from Hamilton, New Zealand
People from Hunterville
Companions of the Queen's Service Order